Grahame is a surname or first name, and may refer to

 Christine Grahame (born 1944), Scottish politician
 Gloria Grahame (1923–1981), American actress
 James Grahame (1756–1811), Scottish poet
 John Grahame (born 1975), American ice hockey player
 Kenneth Grahame (1859–1932), Scottish novelist (The Wind in the Willows)
 Margot Grahame (1911–1982), English actress
 Nikki Grahame (1982–2021), English Big Brother contestant
 Robert Cunninghame Graham of Gartmore (1735–1797), Scottish poet
 Simon Grahame (1570–1614), Scottish writer
 Leonard Grahame (1928–2000), actor who also wrote an epsidoe of The Saint
 SS Grahame, a sternwheeler, operated by the Hudson's Bay Company, on the Mackenzie River systerm

Members of the New South Wales Legislative Assembly

William Grahame (1808–1890) - member for Monaro 1865-69 and 1872-74
William Grahame (1841–1906) - member for Newcastle 1889-89 and 1891-94
William Calman Grahame (1863–1945) - member for Wickham 1907-20

See also
 Graham (surname)